Charles Hyde (29 November 1904 – 11 November 1982) was a British sports shooter. He competed in two events at the 1952 Summer Olympics.

References

1904 births
1982 deaths
British male sport shooters
Olympic shooters of Great Britain
Shooters at the 1952 Summer Olympics
People from Farnham